The Switzerland national rugby union team represents Switzerland in men's international rugby union competitions. Nicknamed The White Flowers (Edelweiss), is considered one of the stronger tier 3 teams in European rugby and currently compete in the second division of the Rugby Europe International Championships in the Rugby Europe Trophy, a competition which is just below the Rugby Europe Championship where the top 6 countries in Europe (apart from the teams in the 6 nations) compete. They are yet to participate in any Rugby World Cup and often play in all red while their alternative kit is all white.

History
Switzerland played their first ever international rugby match on April 11, 1973 in Neuchâtel against Portugal, losing 23–4. The following year they lost 10–18 to Belgium, and were then defeated by them 33–3 in 1975. After the second lost to Belgium, Switzerland won their first international rugby match; defeating Serbia-Montenegro 12–3 in Geneva. The only other win for Switzerland during the 1970s was a 7–4 victory over Luxembourg in 1977. In 1979 they were defeated 43–0 by Morocco and 31–0 by Portugal.

They however bounced back in 1980, defeating Luxembourg  10–7 in Berne, though they then lost close matches against Sweden and Belgium, and were again held to nil by Portugal in 1981, but got a victory over Denmark later that year. After losing to Belgium and Sweden in 1982, they then scored 60 unanswered points against Finland. They then lost nine games in a row from 1982 to 1986, then defeating Serbia-Montenegro 5–0 in May 1986.

In 1989, Switzerland attempted to qualify for the 1991 Rugby World Cup in England, playing in the European tournament – Round 2A. They finished third in the final standings of the round, winning one of their three fixtures. Switzerland also participated in the qualifying tournaments for the 1995 Rugby World Cup in South Africa, making it past the preliminary round from the west group, but not advancing past Round 1.

Switzerland finished third (out of six nations) in Pool 1 of Round 1 of the European qualification tournaments for the 1999 Rugby World Cup in Wales, winning and drawing one game out of four fixtures. Switzerland had more success in the qualifying tournaments for the 2003 Rugby World Cup in Australia, finishing at the top of Pool B in Round 1 and advancing to Round 2, but were unable to advance to Round 3. In attempting to qualify for the 2007 Rugby World Cup in France, Switzerland finished fourth in Pool D of Round 2 of the European qualification process.

Switzerland also failed to qualify for the 2011 or 2015 Rugby World Cups.

In 2016 Switzerland reached the second division (Rugby Europe Trophy, formerly Division 1B) of the ENC for the first time since the divisional structure was implemented in 2000, after winning Division 2A over the 2014-16 two-year cycle.

Record

World Cup

European Competitions Since 2000

Overall
Switzerland national rugby union team results as of 12 march 2023, following match against Ukraine.

Match Record

Current squad
The following players have been selected for the 2022–23 Rugby Europe Trophy.

Head Coach:  Olivier Nier

Caps update: 22 November 2021

Current coaching staff
The current coaching staff of the Swiss national team:

See also
 Rugby union in Switzerland

References

External links
Fédération Suisse de Rugby - Official Site

Teams in European Nations Cup (rugby union)
European national rugby union teams
Rugby union in Switzerland
Rugby union